Nattawin Wattanagitiphat (born 24 February 1994), nicknamed Apo (อาโป) is a Thai actor and model. He is best known for his main roles in Sud Kaen Saen Rak (2015), and KinnPorsche (2022).

Early life and education
Nattawin Wattanagitiphat was born on February 24, 1994. He attended Thammasat University before transferring to Faculty of Communication Arts at Rangsit University.

Career 
In 2014, Nattawin signed a contract as an actor with Channel 3 and made his debut in Sud Kaen Saen Rak. Later in the same year, he starred in a Luead Mungkorn, which is a Thai lakorn series consisting of 5 dramas. In 2018, his last lakorn with Channel 3 was Chart Suer Pun Mungkorn. Nattawin went on hiatus for more than 2 years after his contract expired in 2019.

In 2021, it was announced that Nattawin would return as an actor in the Thai boys' love (BL) series, KinnPorsche The Series, in the lead role of Porsche. The cut version of the series aired on One 31, and the uncut version (KinnPorsche The Series: La Forte) aired on iQIYI from April-June 2022.

Personal life 
In 2019, he was ordained for 1 month at Somphanas Temple.

Filmography

Television

Shows

Discography

Concerts

References

External links
 
Nnattawin1 on Twitter 

Nnattawin on TikTok 

1994 births
Living people
Nattawin Wattanagitiphat
Nattawin Wattanagitiphat
Nattawin Wattanagitiphat
Nattawin Wattanagitiphat